Vidisha Srivastava, known by her mononym Vidisha, is an Indian actress who appears in South Indian cinema and Hindi television. She is known for playing the Anita Vibhuti Narayan Mishra in Bhabiji Ghar Par Hain!

Early life
Vidisha hails from Uttar Pradesh. She has one elder brother and one younger sister actress Shanvi Srivastava. She graduated with a degree in biotechnology and did a course in business management.

Career
Vidisha was an aspiring actor but started her career as a model. She made her film debut at 15  in SP Entertainments's Maa Iddari Madhya. In 2007, she had three releases in early 2007, Alaa, Prem and in E. V. V. Satyanarayana's Athili Sattibabu LKG, out of which Athili Sattibabu LKG was a hit.
Oneindia in its Alaa review wrote that Vidisha "looked gorgeous and she is the only saving grace adding to the film the glamour quotient of the film". About her performance in Athili Sattibabu LKG, Sify wrote, "Vidisha is superb in dance sequences and proved her mettle as a good dancer. She also has enough scope to display her talents". Similarly, Indiaglitz wrote, "Vidisha had performed well, besides filling the glamour slot".

Later in 2007 she made her Kannada debut in Nali Naliyutha (2007). The Times of India wrote, "Vidisha is a perfect choice for the role", while Rediff wrote that she "is yet to learn what acting is all about though she looks glamorous". Her first Tamil film was Kathavarayan, released in 2008  and her first Malayalam film Lucky Jokers released in 2011. She returned to Telugu cinema in 2012 with Devaraya and 123telugu.com wrote that she was good and "may have some future in the industry if she takes care of her projects". She also worked in a Kannada film, Viraat, again.

Filmography

Films

Television

References

External links

Living people
Actresses in Telugu cinema
Actresses in Kannada cinema
21st-century Indian actresses
Indian film actresses
Female models from Uttar Pradesh
Actresses from Uttar Pradesh
Actresses in Malayalam cinema
Actresses in Hindi television
Indian soap opera actresses
Actresses in Tamil cinema
Year of birth missing (living people)